Day One is the third album by Sarah Slean, released in 2004.

Track listing

 "Pilgrim"
 "Lucky Me"
 "Mary"
 "California"
 "Day One"
 "Out in the Park"
 "Vertigo"
 "When Another Midnight"
 "The Score"
 "Your Wish is My Wish"
 "Wake Up"
 "Somebody's Arms" (hidden track)

Notes
 All songs by Sarah Slean
 Published by Sarah Slean (SOCAN) © 2004
 Produced by Peter Prilesnik, Dan Kurtz, Sarah Slean
 Ian D'Sa appears courtesy of Atlantic/Warner
 Howie Beck appears courtesy of True North Records
 Engineered by Peter Prilesnik
 Additional Engineering by Eric Ratz (assisted by Walid Farah) and Kenny Luong at Vespa Music Studios.
 Chris Shreenan - Dyck at The Woodshed and John Nazario at Orange Studios
 Editing by Kenny Luong and Peter Prilesnik
 Mixed by Eric Ratz
 Mastered by Greg Calbi at Sterling Sound, NYC

Personnel
Sarah Slean—piano, vocals, string arrangement/programming, wurlitzer, keyboards, strings, trumpet programming, glockenspiel, orchestral programming, acoustic guitar, timpani, synth bass
Dan Kurtz—bass, keyboards, guitar, programming
Gavin Brown—drums
Kurt Swinghammer—electric guitar, guitar, acoustic guitar
Peter Prilesnik—acoustic guitar, drum programming, bass, guitar
Alex Grant—cello
Karen Graves—violin
Ian D'sa—guitar
Rocky Singh—drums
Paul Brennan—drums
Andrew Aldridge—guitar
Stefan Szczesniak—drums
Howie Beck—backing vocals

Music video

"Day One" was Sarah Slean's second single released from this album.
The music video for the single was directed by Nelson Chan, from the production company flyingmonkeycreations.

Video Links
Warner Music Canada
FlyingMonkeyCreations

2004 albums
Sarah Slean albums